Alexander Mackenzie High School, formerly known as Don Head Secondary School is a public secondary school with classes for students in grades 9 through 12, located in Richmond Hill, Ontario, Canada. The school opened in 1969 as Don Head Secondary School and was renamed Alexander Mackenzie High School in 1992, in honour of Major Addison Alexander Mackenzie, a Richmond Hill resident and philanthropist.

It was announced in October 2008 that AMHS will join Huron Heights S.S., Unionville High School, and Westmount Collegiate as one of the four high schools in York Region to offer a specialized arts program. This program is known as ARTS Mackenzie and encompasses dance, theatre arts, music and visual arts.

In 2017, AMHS, along with G.W. Williams SS, Maple HS, Miliken Mills HS, joined Bayview SS as the board's IB Diploma Programme schools.

Facilities
The original school building was built in 1969 and in 1992 a new wing was added in order to accommodate both the increase in student population and the change in school program. A second addition of 10 classrooms opened in the spring of 2002. The school has two gyms, one larger than the other. The school also has three music rooms, one for vocals, one for strings, and another for band.

Character Matters
In 2003, the Town of Richmond Hill contributed 10 "Character Matters" signs to the school as part of an initiative that encourages young adults to become more involved in their community. This event featured guest speaker Wendel Clark, the former Toronto Maple Leafs Captain.

Departments

Dance
ARTS Mackenzie's dance program is one of the four programs available in the arts program. The dance department has two open-spaced dance studios on the first and second floors, as well as several performance opportunities at the Richmond Hill Centre for the Performing Arts.

English
Alexander Mackenzie High School offers English courses in all grades as well as a Writer's Craft course.

Theatre Arts
As part of the Theatre Arts Mackenzie program, students take four years of drama classes and are taught by artists and professionals who have been in the film or stage industry. Guest speakers, such as local Toronto playwrights and actors as well as guests from the Stratford Festival, are brought in for workshops, such as film acting and stage combat. Students are also given opportunities to expand their portfolios through class assignments, local festivals such as The Ontario Drama Festival, and exposure to new forms of stage and film.

Mathematics
Alexander Mackenzie High School offers math in all grades. It also offers opportunities for students to write different math contests, such as Waterloo Math Contest and American Math Competition.

Music
ARTS Mackenzie's music department offers courses in instrumental band, strings, vocal music, classical guitar, piano, and musical theatre. Approximately 30% of the students at Alexander Mackenzie are involved in the music program. The senior or "Symphonic Band" is well decorated and consistently attains gold or platinum in competitions. However, the music program also leads many other ensembles for both singers and students playing instruments, such as concert band, intermediate band, jazz band, man choir, women's choir, chamber choir, concert choir (Mackenzie singers), jazz choir, and more. There is also a musical theatre course that is open to all students in grades 10–12. Every year, the students in the double-credit course rehearse a musical that they perform at the Richmond Hill Centre for the Performing Arts in December. The musical selections rotate between classical (e.g. The Wizard of Oz), contemporary (e.g. Beauty and the Beast), and popular (e.g. Les Misérables).

Technology
Subject areas include Construction Technology, Design Technology, Transportation Technology, Hospitality Services and Hairstyling Personal Services. The Technology department has two 2-bay auto shops used for the Transportation Technology courses as well as their specialized automotive technology program, which focuses on learning through hands on experience. The school also has a woodshop for the Construction & Design Technology courses.

Physical Education
Alexander Mackenzie hosts several sports matches in both basketball and volleyball, and hosts tournaments for both secondary and elementary schools. Outside the facility, the school has a large football/soccer field, a small soccer field and a baseball diamond.

Notable alumni
Ramin Karimloo: stage actor
Mobolade Ajomale: Olympic sprinter
Hannah Alper: activist, blogger, and motivational speaker
Scott McGillivray: entrepreneur, investor, television host, author, and educator

See also
 Sir Alexander Mackenzie Senior Public School, another similarly named school in the Greater Toronto Area, but after a different person named Alexander Mackenzie
 List of high schools in Ontario

References and notes

External links
Official site

York Region District School Board
High schools in the Regional Municipality of York
Education in Richmond Hill, Ontario
1969 establishments in Ontario
Educational institutions established in 1969